Curculio glandium is a species of European carpophagus weevil in the genus Curculio, the acorn and nut weevils. It eats by a rostrum, an elongated snout, that is used for piercing.

Description
Curculio glandium is a member of the genus Curculio, which comprises seed beetles. All members of Curculio have characteristically long rostrums and ovipositors, an adaptation that specifically developed by their reliance on seeds for food and reproduction.

Male/female differentiation can be determined using the rostrum as the female's is longer. The larvae are short, and cylindrical in shape, and move by means of ridges on the underside of the body.

Life cycle
Curculio glandium eggs are deposited in acorns by the adult weevil chewing channels into the fruit. The eggs are then released using an ovipositor, a long, narrow organ featured in female weevils. These do not reach the acorn's embryo and are healed by the plant, sealing the holes and protecting the eggs from parasites. Upon hatching, either one or two larvae consume the fruit. While they may eat the entirety of the acorn, the larvae typically do not consume the embryo itself. Curculio glandium live throughout winter in the larval stage. The larvae are freeze avoidant, preventing their internal body fluids from freezing during the winter.

Ecology
Curculio glandium can pose a large risk to acorn bearing tree populations. They are highly effective at infecting acorns which can cause a widespread number of seeds to be incapable of germination, with a potential of rendering 70–90% of seeds incapable of germination.

References

Curculioninae
Beetles of Europe
Beetles described in 1802
Taxa named by Thomas Marsham